Miomantis arabica is a species of praying mantis in the family Miomantidae.

See also
List of mantis genera and species

References

A
Mantodea of Asia
Insects of the Middle East